Sir Julian Gordon Priestley  (26 May 1950 – 22 April 2017) was an English civil-servant who served as Secretary-General of the European Parliament 1997–2007. He was the second President of the Young European Federalists 1974–1976.

Biography

Born in Croydon, Priestley was educated at St Boniface's Catholic College, Plymouth, and Balliol College, Oxford, graduating in 1972 with an honours degree in philosophy, politics and economics (PPE). He was president of the Oxford Union and chairman of the Oxford University Labour Club. He stood three times for Labour in Plymouth (twice in Plymouth Sutton and once in Plymouth Devonport) in general elections (in Plymouth Devonport against David Owen). From 1974 to 1976 he was president at European level of the Young European Federalists.

Priestley was an Official of the European Parliament from 1973, first as Administrator, then Principal Administrator with the secretariat of the Committee on Budgets 1973–1983, chairman, Staff Committee of the European Parliament (1981–1983), Head of Division of the Committee on Energy, Research and Technology 1984–1987, Co-chairman of the Staff Regulations Committee of the EC (1985–1987), Director in the Directorate General of Committees and Interparliamentary Delegations, responsible for budgetary affairs and the single market 1987–1989, Secretary General, Socialist Group, European Parliament 1989–1994, Director, Private Office of the President of the European Parliament 1994–1997, and Secretary General, European Parliament from March 1997 until March 2007

The Secretariat of the European Parliament is the administrative body of the European Parliament headed by a Secretary-General. It is based in the Kirchberg district of Luxembourg and around the Brussels-Luxembourg Station in Brussels and employs 4000 officials. As Secretary General, Priestley was the most senior British EU civil servant. Priestley was appointed Knight Commander of the Order of St Michael and St George in the 2007 Birthday Honours. He was asked to participate in the second Irish referendum campaign on the Lisbon Treaty. Priestley is the author of Six Battles That Shaped Europe's Parliament (2008). He died of cancer on 22 April 2017, aged 66.

In his memory, an annual Juilian Priestley lecture was established by former colleagues of his and is hosted by the UK European Movement. The first lecture was given in 2018 by Richard Corbett MEP, the second in 2019 by the TUC General Secretary Frances O'Grady and the third in 2021 (postponed from 2020 due to Covid) by former Irish diplomat Bobby McDonagh, and the fourth in 2022 by the former Green MEP Molly Scott Cato (hosted by Jan Royall at Somerville college Oxford).

References

1950 births
2017 deaths
European Parliament
Knights Commander of the Order of St Michael and St George
Labour Party (UK) parliamentary candidates
People educated at St Boniface's Catholic College
Politicians from Plymouth, Devon
Presidents of the Oxford Union